The Plain Tribals Council of Assam is a political party in the Indian state of Assam.

In 1966, the PTCA launched an agitation for a separate for the plains tribal communities of Assam state called 'Udayachal' under the leadership of Samar Brahma Chowdhury  and Charan Narzary, President and General Secretary of PTCA respectively.

In 1968 PTCA boycotted the  state Assembly Election on demand of re delimitation of the Tribal and indigenous Scheduled Caste Reserved constituencies. Both the President and General secretary were arrested and jailed under PD Act. Few days after following the Tribal and indigenous Scheduled Caste movement under PTCA the local Administration imposed the law of 144.

Thousands of tribal and indigenous Scheduled Caste communities gathered in a field of Bhatarmari village and the mass moved towards the administrative office to submit their appeal of demand to the District Commissioner. The police fires indiscriminately on the charge of violation of 144, hundred of the demonstrators had got bullet injuries, many of them admitted in Kokrajhar Govt. Hospital. Hundreds of demonstrators were arrested and jailed on non bailable act.

The Central Government agreed to provide Autonomous Council against the demand of Udayachal statehood of PTCA. But PTCA rejected the offer of Autonomous Council and sustained to their demand for Udayachal statehood. It was a nonviolent democratic movement, the Government was trying to sabotage.

The ideological  difference and  conflict was weakening the solidarity of PTCA movement for statehood. A section of members of PTCA broke way themselves and decided to go and fight with arms for the Udayachal statehood under the leadership of Binay Brahma. The Government remained indifferent and passive to the PTCA demand, tried to defuse by lingering and taking time.

In the meantime the All Bodo Students Union was emerging with a political aspiration to move for Bodoland statehood rejecting the PTCA's Udayachol statehood. The President and some leaders of PTCA were assassinated by the extremist group of the ABSU. The PTCA's movement for Udayachal, a greater tribal and indigenous Scheduled Caste communities land was rejected by the young generation of the Bodos.

The ABSU finally accepted the Autonomous Council of Bodoland. In the present political scenario Bodoland is facing  a conflict with the non Bodo groups of  tribes and indigenous Scheduled Caste communities who also lives within the Bodoland. The non Bodo tribes and Scheduled Caste feel they are second citizens of Bodoland. In true sense Bodoland is for all the communities of both tribes and indigenous Scheduled Caste communities who live within the geographical jurisdiction of Bodoland.

The Bodoland Territorial Autonomous District Council (BTADC)is a democratically elected body for administration. The complexity among the various tribes and communities are politically created to sabotage the functioning of BTADC as well as the demand for Bodoland statehood. ABSU the non-political organisation of BTAD was founded by Upendranath Brahma in the year of 1967

Political parties in Assam
Year of establishment missing